Holger Kirschke (15 November 1947 – 4 July 2019) was a German swimmer. He competed in the men's 1500 metre freestyle at the 1964 Summer Olympics.

References

External links
 

1947 births
2019 deaths
German male swimmers
Olympic swimmers of the United Team of Germany
Swimmers at the 1964 Summer Olympics
People from Wetzlar
Sportspeople from Giessen (region)
20th-century German people
21st-century German people